Clytemnestra is a figure from Greek mythology.

Clytemnestra may also refer to:

Arts, entertainment, and media 

 Clytemnestra (Collier),  a 1882 oil painting by John Collier
 Clytemnestra (dance), a 1958 ballet by Martha Graham
 Clytemnestra Sutpen, a fictitious character in the 1936 novel Absalom, Absalom!

Other uses 

 Clytemnestra adspersa, synonymous to a species of beetles Neodillonia albisparsa.